East Wilton is an unincorporated village in the town of Wilton, Franklin County, Maine, United States. East Wilton has a post office with ZIP code 04234, which opened on February 29, 1828.

References

Villages in Franklin County, Maine
Villages in Maine